Sandi Morris (born July 8, 1992) is an American pole vault record holder. She won the silver medal in the pole vault event at the 2016 Summer Olympics. She also won silver at the pole vault event at the 2017 World Championships in Athletics and another silver at the 2019 World Championships in Athletics. In 2018 she won gold at the World Indoor Championships. Morris has a personal best vault of  indoor, set on March 12, 2016 in Portland, Oregon. She matched this height at the 2018 World Indoor Champships when setting a new championship record. July 23, 2016, Morris cleared  at American Track League in Houston at Rice University breaking Jennifer Suhr's American outdoor record in the pole vault. Morris cleared  at 2016 IAAF Diamond League Memorial Van Damme in Brussels on September 9, 2016 to set the U.S. women's outdoor pole vault record.

Professional

NCAA

High school
Morris won 2009 and 2010 South Carolina High School League 3A state pole vault titles. Morris is a graduate of Greenville High School where she was a record-setting pole vaulter and all-state volleyball player. Morris was inducted into the Greenville County, SC Schools Hall of Fame in 2021.

References

External links

 

1992 births
Living people
American female pole vaulters
World Athletics Championships athletes for the United States
People from Downers Grove, Illinois
Sportspeople from DuPage County, Illinois
Arkansas Razorbacks women's track and field athletes
Athletes (track and field) at the 2016 Summer Olympics
Medalists at the 2016 Summer Olympics
North Carolina Tar Heels women's track and field athletes
Olympic silver medalists for the United States in track and field
World Athletics Championships medalists
Track and field athletes from Illinois
World Athletics Indoor Championships winners
USA Indoor Track and Field Championships winners
USA Outdoor Track and Field Championships winners
Athletes (track and field) at the 2020 Summer Olympics
20th-century American women
21st-century American women